The Main Squeeze is an album by American jazz organist Jimmy McGriff recorded in 1974 and released on the Groove Merchant label.

Reception 

Allmusic's Jason Ankeny said: "Main Squeeze percolates but never quite boils over. It's a collection of short, sharp and oh-so-sincere funk workouts performed with both style and skill, the album simply plays its cards too close to the vest, controlling the groove but never giving in to it".

Track listing
All compositions by Jimmy McGriff except where noted
 "The Worm Turns" – 4:21
 "The Sermon" (Jimmy Smith) – 3:08
 "The Blues Train to Georgia" – 5:05
 "Misty" (Erroll Garner, Johnny Burke) – 7:38
 "The Main Squeeze" – 3:46
 "GMI" – 4:52
 "These Foolish Things (Remind Me of You)" (Jack Strachey, Holt Marvell, Harry Link) – 5:30
 "Stella by Starlight" (Victor Young, Ned Washington) – 4:29

Personnel
Jimmy McGriff – organ, keyboards
Connie Lester – alto saxophone
Jimmy Ponder – guitar
Eddie Gladden – drums

References

Groove Merchant albums
Jimmy McGriff albums
1974 albums
Albums produced by Sonny Lester